Jennifer Dundas, credited as Jennie Dundas in her early work, is an American actress best known for her role as Chris Paradis, Annie Paradis (Diane Keaton)'s lesbian daughter, in The First Wives Club.

Biography 
Dundas was born in Boston and attended Brown University. Jules Feiffer discovered her when, at age 9, she performed in a play at a summer camp. She also portrayed a young Gloria Vanderbilt in Little Gloria... Happy at Last.

Films in which Dundas has appeared include Puccini for Beginners, Legal Eagles, The Beniker Gang and The Hotel New Hampshire. She has guest starred in TV shows such as Anastasia: The Mystery of Anna, Desperate Housewives and Law and Order: Criminal Intent. 

On stage, Dundas has performed in the New York Theatre, including the play Arcadia. She won an Obie (Off-Broadway) Award for her performance in Good as New by Peter Hedges. In 2004, she portrayed Laura in The Glass Menagerie at the Kennedy Center for the Performing Arts.

Filmography

Film

Television

References

External links

Jennifer Dundas at Internet Off-Broadway Database

Living people
Actresses from Boston
20th-century American actresses
21st-century American actresses
American film actresses
American stage actresses
Obie Award recipients
American television actresses
Year of birth missing (living people)